Please Do Not Fight is an indie rock Band from Redwood City, California.  Reviewers have noted a sound similar to Death Cab for Cutie or Matt and Kim.

In 2008, Please Do Not Fight was a finalist for the opening of Not So Silent Night (a SF-area holiday show produced by Live 105).

In 2010, the band began hosting (and performing at) a monthly Open Mic Night in Redwood city.

In 2011, the band created a series of all-ages shows known as "The Rock Hop"

Discography

 Leave it All Behind (2007)
 Move (2009)
 pastpresentfuture Part 1 (2011)

References

Indie pop groups from San Francisco
Musical groups established in 2007